Allium antonii-bolosii is a species of onion in the Amaryllis family, commonly called the Mallorca onion. It is native to the Balearic Islands in the western Mediterranean (Mallorca, Menorca, and Cabrera), part of Spain.

The plant is sometimes classified as a variety of Allium cupani.

References

antonii-bolosii
Onions
Flora of the Balearic Islands
Plants described in 1953